The Elesavetgrad Cemetery DCHBA is a 2.6 acre Jewish cemetery located in Southeast Washington, D.C. The cemetery was established in December 1911. This cemetery is adjacent to the Ohev Sholom, Adas Israel, Bet Mishpachah and Washington Hebrew cemeteries.

History
The cemetery was founded in 1911. The name is derived from the English equivalent of Elesavetgrad, Ukraine, the ancestral home to many of the founding members.

Notable burials
 Shirley Lewis Povich (1905–1998), Sportswriter

See also
 Bet Mishpachah Cemetery

References

Further reading

External links
 Link to Jeremy Goldberg's Photos of Jewish Sites in Washington DC of this cemetery.
 Shapell Roster foundation of Elesavetgrad and adjectent cemeteries.

1911 establishments in Washington, D.C.
Ashkenazi Jewish culture in Washington, D.C.
Jewish cemeteries in Washington, D.C.
Southeast (Washington, D.C.)
Ukrainian-Jewish culture in the United States
Ukrainian-American culture in Washington, D.C.